The Academy of Canadian Cinema and Television presents an annual award for Best Motion Picture to the best Canadian film of the year.

The award was first presented in 1949 by the Canadian Film Awards under the title Film of the Year. Due to the economics of Canadian film production, however, most Canadian films made in this era were documentaries or short films rather than full-length narrative feature films. In some years, a Film of the Year award was not formally presented, with the highest film award presented that year being in the Theatrical Short or Amateur Film categories.

In 1964, the Canadian Film Awards introduced an award for Best Feature Film. For the remainder of the 1960s, the two awards were presented alongside each other to different films, except in 1965 when a Feature Film was named and a Film of the Year was not, and in 1967 when the same film was named the winner of both categories. After 1970, however, the Film of the Year category was no longer used except in 1975, when due to the cancellation of the awards in 1974, it was presented alongside the Feature Film category as a de facto second Best Picture award, so that winners for both 1974 and 1975 could be named.

As of 1980, the award was taken over by the Academy of Canadian Cinema and Television and presented as part of the Genie Awards ceremony; as of 2013, it is presented as part of the Canadian Screen Awards.

Film of the Year (1949-1975)

1940s

1950s

1960s

1970s

Best Feature Film (1964-1978)

1960s

1970s

Best Motion Picture (1980-present)

1980s

1990s

2000s

2010s

2020s

See also
Prix Iris for Best Film

References

External links
 

Awards for best film